Joseph Emile Harley (September 14, 1880February 27, 1942) was the 100th governor of South Carolina from 1941 to 1942 and a member of the "Barnwell Ring."

Early life and education
Harley was born September 14, 1880, in Williston, South Carolina. Harley received an LLB from the University of South Carolina in 1902. He married Sarah Agnes Richardson and had three children with her.

Occupations
Harley served as a colonel in the South Carolina National Guard and as sergeant of Company L, 1st SC Volunteers in the Spanish–American War. He also worked as a lawyer, where he fought on behalf of three major railway companies including: the Atlantic Coast Line Railroad, Southern Railway, as well as the Seaboard Airline Railroad. As a member of the democratic party, Harley was a delegate at the 1908, 1924, 1928, and 1932 party conventions. Harley also served as the mayor of Barnwell, South Carolina for ten years from 1912-1922.

Governor
After being elected Lieutenant Governor of South Carolina in 1934 and re-elected in 1938, Harley became Governor of South Carolina on November 4, 1941, upon the resignation of Governor Burnet Maybank, who was elected to serve in the US Senate.

On February 27, 1942, Governor Harley died in office after having served only four months. He died of terminal throat cancer.  Harley could only communicate by writing in the last months of his life. He is buried in Baptist Cemetery, Barnwell, South Carolina.

References 

1880 births
1942 deaths
University of South Carolina alumni
American military personnel of the Spanish–American War
Democratic Party governors of South Carolina
University of South Carolina trustees
Deaths from esophageal cancer
People from Williston, South Carolina
Deaths from cancer in South Carolina
20th-century American politicians
People from Barnwell, South Carolina